Warren McDonnell (born 18 January 1959) is a former Australian professional rugby league player. He made five appearances off the bench in the NSWRFL for Parramatta (1981) and the Eastern Suburbs (1982).

References

1959 births
Living people
Australian rugby league players
Parramatta Eels players
Sydney Roosters players